Bolstadøyri Station is located on Bergensbanen railway line located in the village of Bolstadøyri in the municipality of Voss, in Vestland county, Norway. The station is served by twelve daily departures per direction by the Bergen Commuter Rail operated by Vy Tog. The station opened in 1883 as part of Vossebanen.

External links
 Bolstadøyri at the Norwegian National Rail Administration

Railway stations in Voss
Railway stations on Bergensbanen
Railway stations opened in 1883
1883 establishments in Norway